Bel Forest Christian Academy is located in Bel Air, Maryland, United States. It is a relatively small school, with an enrollment of approximately 100 students. The school goes from pre-kindergarten to eighth grade.

The school was built in 1980, and Bel Forest celebrated its twenty-fifth anniversary in 2005. The Governor at the time, Robert Ehrlich, was there and met with school representatives.
The school closed at the end of the 2013–2014 school year.

Merge With James Run Christian High School
At the end of the 2005–2006 school year, the Bel Forest School Board approved a merge with James Run Christian Academy. James Run took the upstairs of the building, while Bel Forest holds the rest of the building. The enrollment of James Run is approximately 25 students. James Run's school year ends June 1 with a graduation for the senior class.

Bel Air, Harford County, Maryland
Private schools in Harford County, Maryland